is a Japanese kickboxer, currently competing in the cruiserweight and heavyweight divisions of K-1. He is a one-time K-1 Cruiserweight title challenger, having fought for the title in 2020.

Kickboxing career

BigBang

Early career
Aitaka made his promotional debut with BigBang against Lin Wuzhong at Bigbang 17 on June 1, 2014. He lost the fight by unanimous decision, with scores of 30–29, 30–28, 30–29. The first professional loss of his career would be followed by the first stoppage loss of his career, as Aitaka lost by a first-round knockout to Andrew Peck at HEAT 33 on September 7, 2014, who knocked him out with a head kick.

Aitaka returned to BigBang for his next bout, as he was booked to face Taichi Furuta at Bigbang 19 on December 7, 2014. He won the fight by unanimous decision, with scores of 30–29、30–28、30–29. Aitaka was then booked to face Nangoku Chojin at SHOOT BOXING 2015 - 30th Anniversary act.1 on February 21, 2015. He lost the fight by a third-round technical knockout.

Aitaka faced Atsushi Ogasawara at Bigbang 21 on June 7, 2015. He notched his first stoppage victory with the promotion, as he knocked Ogasawara with a right straight midway through the opening round. Aitaka faced Shinya Uemura, in his third fight of the year, at Bigbang 22 on September 6, 2015. He won the fight by a first-round knockout, needing just over two minutes to stop his opponent. Aitaka faced Devin Pipose at Bigbang 23 on December 6, 2015, in his final fight of the year. He won the fight by majority decision.

Aitaka faced Ryo Takigawa at Bigbang 24 on February 21, 2016. He won the fight by a second-round technical knockout. Aitaka was next booked to face Xue Wu at Bigbang 25 on June 5, 2016. He won the fight by a second-round technical knockout, extending his winning streak to five consecutive fights.

BigBang Heavyweight champion
His five-fight winning streak earned Aitaka a place in the 2016 BigBang Heavyweight tournament, held to crown the promotions' inaugural champion. Aitaka faced -NORI- in the semifinal bout of the four-man tournament, which took place at Bigbang 26 on September 4, 2016. He won the fight by unanimous decision. Aitaka advanced to the final, held at Bigbang 27 on December 4, 2016, where he faced Taichi Furuta. Aitaka and Furuta previously fought at Bigbang 19 on December 7, 2014, with Aitaka winning by unanimous decision. He was equally successful in their second meeting, as he once again won by unanimous decision, with scores of 30–29、30–28、30–29.

Aitaka made his first BigBang heavyweight title defense against Kousuke Jitsukata at Bigbang Isehara on October 8, 2017. He won the fight by a second-round knockout, stopping Jitsukata with a left hook in the very last second of the round.

Aitaka made his K-1 against Taichi Furuta at K-1 Cruiserweight Championship on November 22, 2017, in the reserve bout of the 2017 K-1 Heavyweight tournament. He won the fight by a first-round technical knockout, after he had knocked Furuta down twice by the 2:17 minute mark.

Aitaka made his second BigBang heavyweight title defense against K-JEE at Bigbang 32 on February 17, 2018. The bout was a rematch of their February 12, 2017 match, which K-JEE won by a third-round technical knockout. Aitaka won the fight by majority decision, with scores of 29–29, 30–29 and 30–29.

Aitaka made his third title defense against Yuki Kudo at Bigbang Isehara 2018 on November 4, 2018. He won the fight by a second-round technical knockout.

Aitaka made his fourth title defense against Daiki Takase at Bigbang 34 on December 26, 2018. He won the fight by unanimous decision, with all three judges scoring the bout 30–29 in his favor.

Aitaka made his fifth and final BigBang heavyweight title defense against OD-KEN at Bigbang 36 on June 6, 2019. Prior to this bout, Aitaka departed from his old gym, Riki Dojo Shizuoka, and began training at K-1 GYM SAGAMI-ONO KREST. Aitaka needed just 37 seconds to knock OD-KEN out with a right hook.

K-1
Aitaka faced the inaugural K-1 cruiserweight champion Sina Karimian in a non-title bout at K-1 World GP 2019 ～Japan vs World～ on August 24, 2019. He won the fight by a third-round knockout. In his post-fight interview, Aitaka called for a rematch with Karimian's title on the line.

Aitaka faced Jae Geun Yang at K-1 World GP 2019 Yokohamatsuri on November 24, 2019. He was awarded a technical knockout victory after just 57 seconds, as Yang was unable to continue due to a shoulder injury.

Aitaka was booked to challenge the reigning K-1 Cruiserweight champion Sina Karimian at K-1: K'Festa 3 on March 22, 2020. Although Aitaka was able to knock Karimian down in the first round, he was himself knocked down with a spinning backfist in the second round. He was unable to recover in the third round and lost the fight by unanimous decision, with all three judges scoring the fight 28–27 for Karimian. 

Aitaka faced Animal Koji at K-1 World GP 2021: K’Festa 4 Day.2 on March 28, 2021, following a year-long absence from the sport. He lost the fight by unanimous decision. Both Aitaka and Koji suffered knockdowns in the first round, but Koji was able to edge Aitaka in the next two round to win the decision.

Aitaka faced K-JEE in a trilogy match at K-1 World GP 2021 in Fukuoka on July 17, 2021. He lost the fight by a second-round knockout.

Aitaka faced the debuting Satoshi Ishii at K-1 World GP 2021: Yokohamatsuri on September 20, 2021. He lost the fight by unanimous decision, after an extra round was fought.

Aitaka faced Hisaki Kato at K-1: K'Festa 5 on April 3, 2022, in the reserve match of the 2022 K-1 Japan Opeweight tournament. He lost the fight by a third-round knockout.

Aitaka faced Hidenori Sakamoto for the vacant BigBang heavyweight championship at Super Bigbang 2022 on November 13, 2022. He lost the fight by unanimous decision, with all three judges scoring the bout 30–29 for Sakamoto.

Aitaka faced Kenta Nanbara at RISE ELDORADO 2023 on March 26, 2023.

Personal life
Aitaka is married to the freelance creator and former idol Sumire Satō. He has 1 child, a daughter named Hinano.

Championships and accomplishments
BigBang 
BigBang Heavyweight Championship (Inaugural; One time; Former)
Five successful title defenses

Kickboxing record

|- style="background:#;"
| 2023-03-26 || ||align=left| Kenta Nanbara || RISE ELDORADO 2023 || Tokyo, Japan || ||  ||
|-  style="text-align:center; background:#fbb;"
| 2022-11-13 || Loss || align=left| Hidenori Sakamoto||  Super Bigbang 2022|| Tokyo, Japan || Decision (Unanimous)|| 3||3:00  
|-
! colspan="9" style="background:white" |
|- style="background:#fbb;"
| 2022-04-03 || Loss ||align=left| Hisaki Kato || K-1: K'Festa 5, Tournament Reserve Match || Tokyo, Japan || KO (Left hook) || 3 || 1:05 
|- style="background:#fbb;"
| 2021-09-20 || Loss ||align=left| Satoshi Ishii || K-1 World GP 2021: Yokohamatsuri || Yokohama, Japan || Ext. R. Decision (Unanimous) || 4 || 3:00
|- style="background:#fbb;"
| 2021-07-17|| Loss ||align=left| K-Jee || K-1 World GP 2021 in Fukuoka || Fukuoka, Japan || KO (Low kick) || 2 || 1:04
|- style="background:#fbb;"
| 2021-03-28|| Loss || align="left" | Animal Koji || K-1 World GP 2021: K’Festa 4 Day.2 || Yoyogi, Japan || Decision (Unanimous) || 3|| 3:00
|- style="background:#fbb;"
| 2020-03-22|| Loss || align="left" | Sina Karimian || K-1: K'Festa 3 || Saitama, Japan || Decision (Unanimous) || 3|| 3:00
|-
! colspan="9" style="background:white" |
|- style="background:#cfc;"
| 2019-11-24|| Win || align="left" | Jae Geun Yang || K-1 World GP 2019 Yokohamatsuri || Osaka, Japan || KO (Shoulder injury) || 1|| 0:57
|- style="background:#cfc;"
| 2019-08-24|| Win || align="left" | Sina Karimian || K-1 World GP 2019 ～Japan vs World～ || Osaka, Japan || KO (Right hook) || 3|| 0:57
|- style="background:#cfc;"
| 2019-06-06|| Win || align="left" | OD-KEN || Bigbang 36 || Tokyo, Japan || KO (Right hook) || 1 || 0:37
|-
! colspan="9" style="background:white" |
|- style="background:#fbb;"
| 2019-02-16|| Loss || align="left" | Rui || Krush 98 || Tokyo, Japan || KO (Flying knee) || 3|| 2:31
|- style="background:#cfc;"
| 2018-12-26|| Win || align="left" | Daiki Takase || Bigbang 34 || Tokyo, Japan || Decision (Unanimous) || 3 || 3:00
|-
! colspan="9" style="background:white" |
|- style="background:#cfc;"
| 2018-11-04|| Win || align="left" | Yuki Kudo || Bigbang Isehara 2018 || Isehara, Kanagawa, Japan || TKO (Right hooks) || 2 || 1:24
|-
! colspan="9" style="background:white" |
|- style="background:#cfc;"
| 2018-08-05|| Win || align="left" | Toshio || Krush 91 || Tokyo, Japan || TKO (Punches) || 2 || 0:53
|- style="background:#fbb;"
| 2018-05-17|| Loss || align="left" | Hitoshi Sugimoto || Krush 88 || Tokyo, Japan || KO (Right head kick) || 3|| 2:21
|- style="background:#cfc;"
| 2018-02-17|| Win || align="left" | K-Jee || Bigbang 32|| Tokyo, Japan || Decision (Majority) || 3 || 3:00
|-
! colspan="9" style="background:white" |
|- style="background:#cfc;"
| 2017-11-22|| Win || align="left" | Taichi Furuta || K-1 Cruiserweight Championship, Tournament Reserve Match || Saitama, Japan || TKO (2 Knockdowns/Right Overhand)  || 1 || 2:17
|- style="background:#cfc;"
| 2017-10-08|| Win || align="left" | Kousuke Jitsukata || Bigbang Isehara 2017 || Isehara, Kanagawa, Japan || KO (Left hook) || 2 || 2:59
|-
! colspan="9" style="background:white" |
|- style="background:#fbb;"
| 2017-08-19|| Loss || align="left" | Masahiro Iwashita || Krush 79 || Nagoya, Japan || Decision (Unanimous) || 3 || 3:00
|- style="background:#cfc;"
| 2017-06-04 || Win || align="left" | Hidenori Sakamoto || Bigbang 29 || Tokyo, Japan || TKO (Punches) || 3 || 2:17
|-
|- style="background:#fbb;"
| 2017-02-12|| Loss || align="left" | K-Jee || Bigbang 28 || Tokyo, Japan || TKO (Low kicks) || 3 || 2:23
|- style="background:#cfc;"
| 2016-12-04 || Win || align="left" | Taichi Furuta || Bigbang 27, Tournament Final || Tokyo, Japan || Decision (Unanimous) || 3 || 3:00
|-
! colspan="9" style="background:white" |
|-
|- style="background:#cfc;"
| 2016-09-04 || Win || align="left" | -NORI- || Bigbang 26, Tournament Semifinal || Tokyo, Japan || Decision (Unanimous) || 3 || 3:00
|-
|- style="background:#cfc;"
| 2016-06-05 || Win || align="left" | Xue Wu || Bigbang 25 || Tokyo, Japan || TKO (Corner stoppage) || 2 || 0:37
|-
|- style="background:#cfc;"
| 2016-02-21 || Win || align="left" | Ryo Takigawa || Bigbang 24 || Tokyo, Japan || TKO || 2 || 2:08
|-
|- style="background:#cfc;"
| 2015-12-06|| Win || align="left" | Devin Pipose || Bigbang 23 || Tokyo, Japan || Decision (Majority) || 3 || 3:00
|-
|- style="background:#cfc;"
| 2015-09-06|| Win || align="left" | Shinya Uemura || Bigbang 22 || Tokyo, Japan || KO (Right straight) || 2 || 2:01
|-
|- style="background:#cfc;"
| 2015-06-07|| Win || align="left" | Atsushi Ogasawara || Bigbang 21 || Tokyo, Japan || KO (Right straight) || 1 || 1:30
|-
|- style="background:#fbb;"
| 2015-02-21|| Loss || align="left" | Nangoku Chojin || SHOOT BOXING 2015 - 30th Anniversary act.1 || Tokyo, Japan || TKO (Three knockdowns) || 3|| 1:12
|- style="background:#cfc;"
| 2014-12-07|| Win || align="left" | Taichi Furuta || Bigbang 19 || Tokyo, Japan || Decision (Unanimous) || 3 || 3:00
|-
|- style="background:#fbb;"
| 2014-09-07|| Loss || align="left" | Andrew Peck || HEAT 33 || Nagoya, Japan || KO (Left high kick) || 1|| 2:06
|-
|- style="background:#fbb;"
| 2014-06-01|| Loss || align="left" | Lin Wuzhong || Bigbang 17 || Tokyo, Japan || Decision (Unanimous) || 3|| 3:00
|-
| colspan=9 | Legend:

See also
 List of male kickboxers

References 

Living people
Japanese male kickboxers
1989 births
Sportspeople from Shizuoka Prefecture
Cruiserweight kickboxers
Heavyweight kickboxers
People from Sagamihara